Campbell Carr Hyatt (June 8, 1880 – December 24, 1945) was an American lawyer and Republican politician who served as a member of the Virginia Senate, representing the state's 3rd district from 1922 to 1924.

Early life
Campbell Carr Hyatt was born on June 8, 1880, in Turkey Cove, Lee County, Virginia to Eliza Ann (née Slemp) and Major John A. G. Hyatt. His father served as a clerk, treasurer and justice of the peace. Major Hyatt also served in the Civil War in the 64th Virginia Mounted Infantry Regiment. Hyatt attended public schools in Jonesville, Virginia, but left school at the age of 16 due to an accident causing a physical disability.

Career
At the age of 19, Hyatt began clerking in the store of J. F. Witt at Zions Mills. He clerked there for one year. He then worked one year with his brother at the Pennington Gap Bank. Hyatt then became a cashier and bookkeeper for the Virginia Iron, Coal & Coke Company, and then worked in the life insurance business in Lee and Wise County for two years.

In 1904, Hyatt was elected cashier of the First National Bank in Norton. He served until 1909, when he was elected president of the bank. He remained in that role until 1912. On June 13, 1913, Hyatt moved to Richlands and purchased the Richland Brickyards and formed the Richland Brick Corporation. He served as president and treasurer of the company and his wife served as secretary. He retired in 1930 and leased the company to the General Shale Corporation, which he became a director of. Hyatt also served as secretary-treasurer of the Town Hill Coal Land Corporation of Richlands.

In 1919, Hyatt was elected as a Republican to the Virginia House of Delegates, representing both Tazewell and Buchanan Counties, during the 1920 session. He was then elected to the Virginia Senate from the 3rd district in 1921. In the 3rd district, he represented Buchanan, Tazewell, Dickinson and Russell Counties. He served in the Senate from 1922 to 1926.

During World War I, Hyatt was a chairman of Liberty Loan drives and was a member of the Four Minute Men.

Personal life
Hyatt married Mary Bell Robinson of Wytheville, Virginia at Graham's Forge on April 10, 1906. Together, they had five children: Campbell Carr Jr., Bettie Graham, Ann, John Robinson and Mary Bell.

Death
Hyatt died on December 24, 1945, of a stroke at a hospital in Richlands. He was buried at the Graham Family Cemetery in Wythe County.

References

External links

 

1880 births
1945 deaths
People from Lee County, Virginia
People from Richlands, Virginia
Republican Party members of the Virginia House of Delegates
Republican Party Virginia state senators
20th-century American politicians